Kari Anne Dooley (née Pederson; born 1963) is a United States district judge of the United States District Court for the District of Connecticut.

Biography 

Dooley received her Bachelor of Arts from Cornell University, and her Juris Doctor, cum laude, from the University of Connecticut School of Law.

She began her legal career as an associate in the Greenwich office of Whitman & Ransom. She served for twelve years as an Assistant United States Attorney for the District of Connecticut, rising to the rank of Supervisory Assistant United States Attorney and, ultimately, Counsel to the United States Attorney. From 2004 to 2018, she served as a Judge of the Connecticut Superior Court.

Federal judicial service 

On December 20, 2017, President Donald Trump nominated Dooley to serve as a United States District Judge of the United States District Court for the District of Connecticut, to the seat vacated by Judge Robert N. Chatigny, who assumed senior status on January 1, 2017. On March 7, 2018, a hearing on her nomination was held before the Senate Judiciary Committee. On April 19, 2018, her nomination was reported out of committee by a 19–2 vote. On September 6, 2018, her nomination was confirmed by voice vote. She received her judicial commission on September 13, 2018.

References

External links 
 

1963 births
Living people
20th-century American lawyers
21st-century American lawyers
21st-century American judges
Assistant United States Attorneys
Connecticut lawyers
Connecticut state court judges
Cornell University alumni
Judges of the United States District Court for the District of Connecticut
People from New York City
United States district court judges appointed by Donald Trump
University of Connecticut School of Law alumni
20th-century American women lawyers
21st-century American women lawyers
21st-century American women judges